Ho Ho Ho is a Romanian Christmas-themed family comedy film starring Romanian music and TV icon Ştefan Bănică, Jr., directed by Jesus del Cerro, and produced by MediaPro Pictures as the first Romanian comedy film about Christmas.

Background

Filming took place over a 4-week period in June and July 2009, at the Băneasa Shopping City Mall in Bucharest and at MediaPro Studios in Buftea and in Bucharest. Spanish director Jesus del Cerro also worked in Romania on the TV series One Step Ahead and on the television films The Countdown and The Countdown 2: No Escape.

Plot
Horaţiu (Bogdan Iancu) is an 8-year-old boy who still believes in Santa Claus. As a Christmas gift, his mother (Alina Chivulescu) takes him to the mall to buy him a gift. What might otherwise have been a normal day becomes an adventure when Horaţiu gets lost. He meets Ion (Ştefan Bănică, Jr.), a thief disguised as Santa Claus who is there to steal a diamond for Vandame (Valentin Teodosiu) and his gang of fake Santas. Out of character for Santa Claus, Ion is rude and doesn't seem to like kids. However, the boy believes he is the real Santa and decides to stay with him despite Ion's attempts to abandon the boy. As the day goes on, the two enter a series of dangerous yet funny misadventures. By the end of the day they become great friends, both learning something from each other. And because it is Christmas and miracles do happen, everyone gets their wish.

Main characters

Ion (Santa Claus)
Ion is a different type of Santa. Although, at first, he desperately tries to get rid of the kid, he eventually grows fond of Horaţiu as the boy is the only one who finds something good in him. Moreover, the boy helps him rediscover the magic of Christmas and makes him realize how much he misses his son and wife, who live in Italy.

Horaţiu
Despite being only 8 years old, Horaţiu is extremely smart for his age: he speaks English, has a passion for origami and rewrites all the books his mother bought for him. He is clever and always manages to find a creative way out of difficult situations. Raised only by his mother, Horaţiu is very optimistic and keeps on trusting Ion whom he believes is the real Santa. At the end of the day, Horaţiu discovers in Ion the friend he never had.

Carmen
She is a young, beautiful and intelligent woman who dedicated herself to raising Horaţiu. After noticing that Horaţiu is missing, she does everything within her power to find him. When she needs help the most, fate brings Marin into her life. Even though her first impression of him isn't one of the best, Carmen finds Marin to be a good man, a good friend and... more.

Marin
He is a mall bodyguard and the type of person that has seen too many B-rated action flicks. He falls head over heels for Carmen and wastes no effort in trying to help her find Horaţiu. By the end, Carmen gets to know his true personality and the two share a love story. Caring and big-hearted, Marin proves to have what it takes to be a father for Horaţiu.

Partial cast
Ştefan Bănică, Jr. as Ion / Mos Craciun 
Alina Chivulescu as Carmen
Bogdan Iancu as Horaţiu
Pavel Bartoș as Marin
Valentin Teodosiu as Vandame
Costin Gabriel as Calistrat
Daniel Popescu as Sămânţă
Iulia Lazăr as Gora
Raluca Aprodu as Irina
David Vasile as Ion's son
Cătălin Măruță as TV host
Emil Hossu as Ion's father

See also
 List of Christmas films

References

External links
 
 Ho Ho Ho Official website

2009 films
2000s Romanian-language films
2000s Christmas comedy films
Romanian Christmas comedy films
Films set in Romania